Orlando Gutiérrez may refer to:

 Orlando Gutierrez-Boronat (born 1965), Cuban author
 Orlando Gutiérrez (Spanish footballer) (born 1976), Spanish footballer for Club Portugalete
 Orlando Gutiérrez (Chilean footballer) (born 1989), Chilean footballer for Ñublense